Only Love is a 2014 South Korean daily drama television series starring Seo Ha-joon, Im Se-mi, Lee Kyu-han, Nam Bo-ra, Yoon Jong-hoon, and Kim Ye-won. It aired on SBS on Mondays to Fridays at 19:20 for 123 episodes from June 2 to December 12, 2014.

Plot
Kim Tae-yang is a physician and Choi Yoo-ri is a broadcasting producer. Choi Jae-min is a dandy-ish executive at a clothing company and Kim Saet-byul is an unwed mother. Kim Woo-joo is much younger than Hong Mi-rae.

As these three couples fall in love, they explore issues of age difference, blood ties and adoption, and wealth and poverty.

Cast

Main characters
Seo Ha-joon as Kim Tae-yang
Im Se-mi as Choi Yoo-ri
Lee Kyu-han as Choi Jae-min
Nam Bo-ra as Kim Saet-byul
Yoon Jong-hoon as Kim Woo-joo
Kim Ye-won as Hong Mi-rae

Supporting characters
Jung Sung-mo Kim Sang-bae
Song Ok-sook as Oh Mal-sook
Yoon So-jung as Yang Yang-soon
Jung Hye-sun as Woo Jeom-soon
Han Seo-jin as Kim Soo-ah
Kil Yong-woo as Choi Dong-joon
Lee Eung-kyung as Lee Young-ran
Lee Hyun-wook as Choi Yoo-bin
Seo Woo-rim as Kang Min-ja 
Noh Young-gook as Choi Myung-joon
Oh Mi-hee as Jung Sook-hee
Lee Jung-eun as Park Soon-ja
Lee Ga-ryeong as Head of design department
Kim Na-young
Shin Soo-jung
Joo Hyun-jin

Awards and nominations

References

External links
Only Love official SBS website 

Seoul Broadcasting System television dramas
2014 South Korean television series debuts
Korean-language television shows
2014 South Korean television series endings
South Korean romance television series